The third battle at the Uji River was the primary battle of the Jōkyū War in Japan. Bakufu forces led by Imperial regent Hōjō Yoshitoki sought to enter Kyoto and overthrow Emperor Go-Toba, using Uji and Seta as their gateways.

The Emperor's forces, alongside warrior monks from Mount Hiei, attempted to make a final stand at the bridge into Kyoto, defending it from the Shōgun's armies.

The bakufu forces attacked the entire river line from Uji to Seta, and the Imperial forces stood firm for many hours. However, eventually they broke through and scattered the remaining defenders, and opening the way into the city for the rest of their rebel forces.

As had happened twice before (see Battle of Uji), the bridge over the Uji-gawa proved to be a tactically crucial entryway into Kyoto, and highly defensible; but, as before, it was ultimately not defensible enough and the attackers crossed the river and entered Kyoto.

References 

1220s in Japan
1221 in Asia
Uji 1221
Uji 1221
Uji 1221